Andrea Tidona  (born 30 November 1951) is an Italian actor and voice actor.

Life and career 
Born in Modica, Sicily, Tidona formed at the Accademia dei Filodrammatici and later worked several years at the Piccolo Teatro in Milan, under Giorgio Strehler. In 2004, he won the Nastro d'Argento for best actor for his performance in Marco Tullio Giordana's The Best of Youth.  He is well known for the role of Carmine Fazio in The Young Montalbano.

Selected filmography 
 Life Is Beautiful (1997)
 One Hundred Steps (2000)
 Il commissario (2001)
 The Best of Youth (2001)
 Once You're Born You Can No Longer Hide (2005)
 The Caiman (2006)
 The Listening (2006)
 Butta la luna (2006)
 Il 7 e l'8 (2007)
 Il Capo dei Capi (2007)
 The Entrepreneur (2011) 
 The Young Montalbano (2012) 
 The Face of an Angel (2014)
 Italo (2014)

References

External links 
 
 

1951 births
People from Modica
Italian male stage actors
Italian male film actors
Italian male television actors
Italian male voice actors
Living people
21st-century Italian male actors
Nastro d'Argento winners
Actors from the Province of Ragusa